Vienna College, Namugongo is a private co-education institution.

History 
Vienna College Namugongo commenced in February 1999 as a result of an invitation by the Ugandan President Yoweri Museveni to Austrians to invest in the Ugandan Education sector.

Two notable Austrians, Brigadier Helmut Moser and Major Gabriel Rudolf partnering with Ugandan educationalist Dr. J.C. Muyingo mobilized resources to establish this project. Emmanuel Wamala, the Archbishop of Kampala archdiocese donated the land onto which Vienna College Namugongo sits today.

A home to over four hundred students, Vienna College Namugongo, is a private co-education institution. It opened its doors to International students early in January 2000, rapidly establishing itself as a haven for senior students from Kenya, Burundi, Rwanda, Tanzania, Europe, the United States and of course, its home setting- Uganda.

In mid-2005, a new Board took over control and ownership of Vienna College Namugongo. The Board  includes Mr. Bob Kabonero, Mr Jasi Kassami, Mr. William Byaruhanga and Mr. Enoch Rukidi, the Resident Executive Director. They have transformed the school into a fully fledged International school. Ms. Nisha Naamara oversees the development of Vienna as a Business Consultant and Governor, a position initially held by Denise Kalule.

Vienna College is a University of Cambridge International Examinations (CIE) Centre UG010 offering IGCSE, GCE “A” Level” courses and A.I.C.E Diploma Awards. Currently, Vienna College is the largest CIE Centre in Uganda based on the enrolment and candidates entered for IGCSE and “A” Level examinations for June and November 2007 to 2012. The college had its last academic participation in the UNEB ‘O’ Level and ‘A’ Level examination programmes in 2010.

External links 
Vienna College Namugongo

References

International schools in Uganda
Cambridge schools in Uganda
Schools in Kampala
1999 establishments in Uganda
Educational institutions established in 1999